The following outline is provided as an overview and topical guide to the U.S. State of Rhode Island:

General reference 

 Names
 Common name: Rhode Island
 Pronunciation: 
 Official name: State of Rhode Island
 Abbreviations and name codes
 Postal symbol:  RI
 ISO 3166-2 code:  US-RI
 Internet second-level domain:  .ri.us
 Nicknames
 Little Rhody
 Ocean State (currently used on license plates)
 Adjectival: Rhode Island
 Demonym: Rhode Islander

Geography of Rhode Island 

Geography of Rhode Island
 Rhode Island is: a U.S. state, a federal state of the United States of America
 Location
 Northern hemisphere
 Western hemisphere
 Americas
 North America
 Anglo America
 Northern America
 United States of America
 Contiguous United States
 Eastern United States
 East Coast of the United States
 Northeastern United States
 New England
 Northeast megalopolis
 Population of Rhode Island: 1,052,567  (2010 U.S. Census)
 Area of Rhode Island:
 Atlas of Rhode Island

Places in Rhode Island 

 Historic places in Rhode Island
 National Historic Landmarks in Rhode Island
 National Register of Historic Places listings in Rhode Island
 Bridges on the National Register of Historic Places in Rhode Island
 National Natural Landmarks in Rhode Island
 State parks in Rhode Island

Environment of Rhode Island 

 Climate of Rhode Island
 Protected areas in Rhode Island
 State forests of Rhode Island
 Superfund sites in Rhode Island

Natural geographic features of Rhode Island 

 Lakes of Rhode Island
 Rivers of Rhode Island

Regions of Rhode Island

Demography of Rhode Island 

Demographics of Rhode Island

Government and politics of Rhode Island 

Politics of Rhode Island
 Form of government: U.S. state government
 United States congressional delegations from Rhode Island
 Rhode Island State Capitol
 Political party strength in Rhode Island

Branches of the government of Rhode Island 

Government of Rhode Island

Executive branch of the government of Rhode Island 
Governor of Rhode Island
Lieutenant Governor of Rhode Island
 Secretary of State of Rhode Island
 State departments
 Rhode Island Department of Transportation

Legislative branch of the government of Rhode Island 

 Rhode Island General Assembly (bicameral)
 Upper house: Rhode Island Senate
 Lower house: Rhode Island House of Representatives

Judicial branch of the government of Rhode Island 

Courts of Rhode Island
 Supreme Court of Rhode Island

Law and order in Rhode Island 

Law of Rhode Island
 Cannabis in Rhode Island
 Capital punishment  in Rhode Island
 Constitution of Rhode Island
 Crime in Rhode Island
 Gun laws in Rhode Island
 Law enforcement in Rhode Island
 Law enforcement agencies in Rhode Island
 Rhode Island State Police
 Prisons in Rhode Island
 Same-sex marriage in Rhode Island

Military in Rhode Island 

 Rhode Island Air National Guard
 Rhode Island Army National Guard

Local government in Rhode Island 

Local government in Rhode Island

History of Rhode Island 

History of Rhode Island

History of Rhode Island, by period 
Indigenous peoples
English Colony of Providence, 1636–1644
English Colonies of Rhode Island, 1638–1644
Portsmouth Compact, 1638
English Colony of Providence Plantations, 1644–1663
History of slavery in Rhode Island
English Colony of Rhode Island and Providence Plantations, 1663–1686
King Philip's War, 1675–1676
English Dominion of New-England in America, 1686–1689
English Colony of Rhode Island and Providence Plantations, 1689–1707
British  Colony of Rhode Island and Providence Plantations, 1707–1776
King George's War, 1740–1748
Treaty of Aix-la-Chapelle of 1748
French and Indian War, 1754–1763
Treaty of Paris of 1763
American Revolutionary War, April 19, 1775 – September 3, 1783
Treaty of Paris, September 3, 1783
State of Rhode Island and Providence Plantations since 1776
Rhode Island declares its independence from the United Kingdom, May 4, 1776
United States Declaration of Independence, July 4, 1776
Fourth state to ratify the Articles of Confederation and Perpetual Union, signed July 9, 1778
Thirteenth state to ratify the Constitution of the United States of America on May 29, 1790
War of 1812, June 18, 1812 – March 23, 1815
Treaty of Ghent, December 24, 1814
Dorr Rebellion, 1841–1842
Mexican–American War, April 25, 1846 – February 2, 1848
American Civil War, April 12, 1861 – May 13, 1865
Rhode Island in the American Civil War

History of Rhode Island, by region

By municipality 
 History of Burrillville
 History of Newport
 History of Providence

Culture of Rhode Island 

Culture of Rhode Island
 Cuisine of Rhode Island
 Museums in Rhode Island
 Religion in Rhode Island
 Episcopal Diocese of Rhode Island
 Scouting in Rhode Island
 State symbols of Rhode Island
 Flag of the state of Rhode Island and Providence Plantations 
 Seal of the state of Rhode Island and Providence Plantations

The arts in Rhode Island 
 Music of Rhode Island

Sports in Rhode Island 

Sports in Rhode Island

Economy and infrastructure of Rhode Island 

Economy of Rhode Island
 Communications in Rhode Island
 Newspapers in Rhode Island
 Radio stations in Rhode Island
 Television stations in Rhode Island
 Health care in Rhode Island
 Hospitals in Rhode Island
 Transportation in Rhode Island
 Airports in Rhode Island

Education in Rhode Island 

Education in Rhode Island
 Schools in Rhode Island
 School districts in Rhode Island
 High schools in Rhode Island
 Colleges and universities in Rhode Island
 University of Rhode Island
 Brown University

See also

Topic overview:
Rhode Island

Index of Rhode Island-related articles

References

External links 

Rhode Island
Rhode Island
 1